Tom McRae is the self-titled debut album from British singer-songwriter Tom McRae.  The album was released in 2000 and was nominated for the 2001 Mercury Music Prize.

Track listing
All tracks by Tom McRae
 "You Cut Her Hair" – 2:46
 "End of the World News (Dose Me Up)" – 3:48
 "2nd Law" – 2:50
 "Bloodless" – 3:38
 "Draw Down the Stars" – 2:14
 "One More Mile" – 4:16
 "Boy With the Bubblegun" – 3:01
 "Hidden Camera Show" – 4:17
 "A & B Song" – 4:15
 "Language of Fools" – 3:57
 "Untitled" – 3:51
 "Sao Paulo Rain" – 4:51
 "I Ain't Scared of Lightning" – 1:25

Personnel
 Tom McRae – vocals, electric guitar (1,12), fx (1,4), string arrangement (1,7), guitar (2,4,6,7,8,10,13), percussion (2,6,9,10), piano (3,10), harmonium (4), acoustic guitar (5,9,12), 12 string (7), harmonica (9), keyboards (13)
 Jo Archard – strings (4)
 Sarah Button – strings (4)
 Anthony Clarke – string arrangement (2,10), piano (8,12)
 Mark Frith – electric guitar (2,6,9), piano (2,10), keyboards (2), bass (2,6,9), hammond (9,10)
 Fiona Griffith – strings (4)
 Tom Havelock – cello (1,7,8)
 Chris Hughes – percussion (2,9,10), drums (9)
 Clive Jenner – drums (2,8,10,12), percussion (8)
 Howard Jones – piano (11)
 Tony Marrison – programming (1,2,3,6,9), piano (1,5), string arrangement (1,7), hammond (3), keyboards (5,12), percussion (5,8), guitar (6), bass (8,12)
 Helen Thomas – strings (4)

References

2000 debut albums
Albums produced by Chris Hughes (musician)
Tom McRae albums